Jason "Sundance" Head (born July 9, 1978) is an American country-soul singer and songwriter. He is the son of American singer Roy Head. In 2007, he was a semi-finalist on the sixth season of the Fox television series American Idol, but was eliminated one week before the finals. In 2016, he became the winner of season 11 of the US The Voice. He was part of Team Blake Shelton. His winning song is "Darlin' Don't Go". In 2018, he signed onto Dean Dillon's Wildcatter Records and released the single Leave Her Wild.

Career

American Idol

American Idol performances

Post-Idol career
In May 2007, his father reported that he signed a recording contract with Universal Music Group. In late July 2007, he released a duet with Sabrina Sloan, who was also a semi-finalist in Season 6 of American Idol.

The Voice (2016)

The Voice performances
 – Studio version of performance reached the top 10 on iTunes

Discography

Releases from The Voice

Albums

Competition singles

Singles
2016: "Darlin' Don't Go"
2017: "How I Want to Be"
2017: "Everything to Lose"
2018: "Leave Her Wild"
2019: "Close Enough to Walk"

Notes

References

External links

 Sundance Head at Last.fm

1978 births
Living people
21st-century American male singers
21st-century American singers
American Idol participants
American male singer-songwriters
People from Montgomery County, Texas
Singer-songwriters from Texas
The Voice (franchise) winners